Amy Foster (born 2 October 1988) is an Irish athlete specialising in the sprinting events. She is a two times Summer Universiade finalist, from 2011 and 2013. In addition, she represented Ireland at three European Championships and Northern Ireland at two Commonwealth Games.

Competition record

Personal bests
Outdoor
100 metres – 11.40 (+1.7 m/s) (Clermont 2014)
200 metres – 23.53 (0.0 m/s) (Shenzhen 2011)
Indoor
60 metres – 7.32 (Athlone 2014)

References

1988 births
Living people
Female sprinters from Northern Ireland
Athletes (track and field) at the 2010 Commonwealth Games
Athletes (track and field) at the 2014 Commonwealth Games
Athletes (track and field) at the 2018 Commonwealth Games
Commonwealth Games competitors for Northern Ireland